The Tulsa metropolitan area, officially defined as the Tulsa metropolitan statistical area is a metropolis in northeastern Oklahoma centered around the city of Tulsa and encompassing Tulsa, Rogers, Wagoner, Osage, Creek, Okmulgee and Pawnee counties. It had a population of 1,023,988 according to the 2021 U.S. census estimates.

Counties
The Tulsa metropolitan area (TMA) consists of the following counties, listed in descending order of population (2010 census):
 Tulsa County
 Rogers County
 Wagoner County
 Creek County
 Osage County
 Okmulgee County
 Pawnee County

Osage County, the largest county by land area in Oklahoma comprises 36 percent of the TMA. Wagoner County, with 8 percent of the area, is the smallest county of the TMA. Tulsa County has the highest population density by far (1,058.1 people per square mile) and Osage County has the lowest (21.1 people per square mile).

Cities

The Tulsa metropolitan area's anchor city, Tulsa, is surrounded by two primary rings of suburbs. Connected by suburban sprawl, the cityscapes of Tulsa and its initial outlying ring of suburbs form to make the immediate Tulsa Urban Area, an area that sits apart from a second ring of noncontiguous suburbs. Comprising the first ring of suburbs are: Catoosa, Bixby, Broken Arrow, Jenks, Owasso, Sand Springs, Sapulpa and Turley. Cities and towns in the second ring of suburbs include, Claremore, Okmulgee, Glenpool, Collinsville, Wagoner, Coweta, Skiatook, and Inola.

Largest cities

Tulsa

Tulsa, home to 413,066 people in 2020, is the principal cultural and economic hub of the Tulsa metropolitan area (TMA). The city, once known as the Oil Capital of the World, is still home to a large array of international oil-related industries, financial corporations, and manufacturing bases. The city contains the region's only public two-year college Tulsa Community College, and only private four-year universities, Oral Roberts University, and the University of Tulsa. The Tulsa International Airport and Tulsa Port of Catoosa serve as the region's primary international travel and shipping hubs.

Broken Arrow

Broken Arrow is the metropolitan area's second largest city. According to the 2020 US Census, Broken Arrow has a population of 113,540 residents and is the fourth largest city in the state. It is the 267th-largest city in the United States. Once a bedroom community for nearby Tulsa, Broken Arrow has emerged in recent decades as an economic center in its own right. In 2007, the city was rated the safest city in Oklahoma and 20th safest in the nation, as well as one of the nation's 100 best places to live.

Owasso

Owasso, a bedroom community of 38,240 people in 2020, is the third largest city in the Tulsa metropolitan area and one of the fastest-growing in the state. Situated just north of the Tulsa International Airport and the Tulsa Zoo in Tulsa and Rogers counties, the city is connected to Tulsa by Highway 169 and contains a large base of upscale retail.

Bartlesville

Bartlesville is an exurb of the city of Tulsa. With 37,290 people in 2020, the city is the fourth largest in the Tulsa-Bartlesville Combined Statistical Area, though it is not considered part of the immediate Tulsa Statistical Area by the Census Bureau. It is the county seat of Washington County, and contains the only skyscraper built by famed architect Frank Lloyd Wright, the Price Tower. Oklahoma Wesleyan University,a private four-year university and a branch of Rogers State University are Bartlesville's primary institutions of higher education.

Muskogee

Muskogee is another exurb of the city of Tulsa. With 36,878 people in 2020, the city is the fifth largest in the Tulsa-Bartlesville Combined Statistical Area. It is the county seat of Muskogee County. Bacone College, a private four-year university, and branches of Connors State College and Northeastern State University are Muskogee's primary institutions of higher education.

Bixby

Bixby, located south of Tulsa, is a rapidly growing city to the south of Tulsa. It had a population of 28,609 at the 2020 census, a 13.70 percent increase from the 2010 census. It also has the largest per capita income in the TMA. Originally an agricultural community known as "The Garden Spot of Oklahoma", it has largely become a bedroom community in the Tulsa area.

Jenks

Jenks, the sixth largest city in the TMA, is another rapidly growing suburb of Tulsa, located southwest of Tulsa largely between the Arkansas River and U.S. Route 75. A portion of the Jenks Public School District extends east of the Arkansas River encompassing a part of the city of Tulsa south of 91st street. It is one of the fastest-growing cities in Oklahoma. As of the 2020 census, the city population was 26,017,  compared to 16,924 in 2010, an increase of 49.4 percent.  Jenks is known as the "Antiques Capitol of Oklahoma" and is home to the Oklahoma Aquarium.

Sapulpa

Sapulpa is a city in Creek and Tulsa counties, with its town center located approximately 14 miles southwest of downtown Tulsa. It is also the seat of Creek County. The population was 21,937 at the 2020 United States census, compared to 20,544 at the 2010 census), making it the seventh largest city in the TMC. It is the county seat of Creek County.

Sand Springs

Sand Springs, a diverse urban community is one of the oldest suburbs of Tulsa, and eighth largest city in the TMA. The population was 18,906 in the 2010 U.S. Census and 19,926 in the 2020 U.S. Census. It is located along the Arkansas River, just five miles west of downtown Tulsa. It has a fast-growing residential population and is recognized as a hub of industrial activity. Attractions in Sand Springs include the Keystone Ancient Forest, Sand Springs Pogue Airport, the Canyons at Blackjack Ridge Golf Course and easy access to Keystone State Park. The city is connected to Tulsa by Highway 412/64, 41st Street and Avery Drive.

Claremore

Claremore, the ninth largest city in the TMA, is an outer suburb of Tulsa and the county seat of Rogers County. The population was 19,580 at the 2020 census. It is home to Rogers State University, a public four-year university located on the city's west side. The city is home to many historical figures such as Will Rogers, a famous actor, Lynn Riggs, author of the novel that inspired the musical Oklahoma. Claremore is also the setting of Oklahoma the musical. Country singer Garth Brooks also lives just outside Claremore. The Will Rogers Memorial is located in Claremore.

Other communities
North – Skiatook, Collinsville, Pawhuska, Dewey, Barnsdall.

West – Cleveland, Kellyville, Mannford, Hominy.

East – Catoosa, Wagoner, Coweta, Porter, Inola, Verdigris, Pryor Creek.

South – Glenpool, Mounds, Beggs, Okmulgee,  Henryetta and Haskell.

Metropolitan statistics

As of the census of 2010, there were 937,478 people, 367,091 households, and 246,290 families residing within the MSA. The racial makeup of the MSA were as follows:

 White: 70.9% (68.7% Non-Hispanic White) 
 Black or African American: 8.4%
 American Indian and Alaskan Native: 8.3%
 Asian: 1.8% (0.3% Vietnamese, 0.3% Indian, 0.3% Hmong, 0.2% Chinese)
 Pacific Islander: 0.1%
 Two or more races: 6.4%
 Some other race: 4.2%
 Hispanic or Latino (of any race): 8.4% (6.6% Mexican, 0.3% Puerto Rican, 0.2% Spanish, 0.2% Guatemalan)

The median income for a household in the MSA was $47,760 and the median income for a family was $59,746. The per capita income was $26,029.

Combined Statistical Area
Based on commuting patterns, the Federal Census Bureau defines the adjacent micropolitan areas of Muskogee (Muskogee County), Bartlesville (Washington County) and Tahlequah (Cherokee County) into a region known as the Tulsa–Muskogee–Bartlesville Combined Statistical Area (CSA), commonly known as the Green Country region. The population of this wider region is 1,134,125 — nearly one-third of Oklahoma's population—as of 2020. The Tulsa CSA is the 48th largest CSA, and the 54th largest primary census statistical area in the country.

Transportation

Interstate Highways and turnpikes
The Tulsa metropolitan area is heavily reliant on automobiles as a means of transportation. Interstate 44 (which runs northeast–southwest), U.S. Highway 75 (which runs north–south) and U.S. Highway 412 (which runs east–west) serve as the major thoroughfares of the region. Turnpikes play a vital role in the region's transportation system. The Will Rogers, Turner, Muskogee, Cimarron, and Creek turnpikes aide travel in the area.

Rail, seaport, and airport facilities
The area is home to the nation's farthest inland port, the Tulsa Port of Catoosa. This port, along with the Port of Muskogee, is situated along the McClellan-Kerr Arkansas River Navigation System, which helps in the shipment of goods to international trade routes. Several major rail lines are located throughout the region, although the Tulsa metropolitan area is one of the largest urban areas in the nation not served by Amtrak. The region's principal airport is the Tulsa International Airport, which offers domestic passenger service. Other minor airports serving general aviation are located throughout the region.

Education

Common education
The Tulsa metropolitan area, like much of the state of Oklahoma, is served by independent school districts. Each county contains several school districts and each school district is governed by a local school board. The region's largest school district is Tulsa Public Schools.

Higher education
See also List of colleges and universities in Tulsa, Oklahoma.

The Tulsa metro is home to several colleges and universities. The Tulsa area's largest private schools are University of Tulsa and Oral Roberts University. Rogers State University is located in Claremore with branch campuses in Bartlesville and Pryor. Also, there are branch campuses of major state colleges, such as Oklahoma State University–Tulsa, University of Oklahoma-Tulsa, and Northeastern State University in Broken Arrow. Langston University, Oklahoma's only Historically Black College (HBCU) has a satellite branch in Tulsa. Tulsa Community College serves thousands of students as the region's primary junior college.

Two medical schools are also located in the region: Oklahoma State University Center for Health Sciences and University of Oklahoma College of Medicine, where students can attend all four years of medical school since 2017.

The only law school in northeastern Oklahoma is the University of Tulsa College of Law.

As of 2011, 30% of adults in the City of Tulsa held a bachelor's degree or higher. In Broken Arrow 32% of adults held degrees, in Owasso 31% held degrees, in Bixby 38% held degrees, in Jenks 46% held degrees, and in Bartlesville 31% held degrees. This compares to 23.0% for all of Oklahoma and 28.2% for the entire U.S. In 2009, Businessweek ranked Tulsa as one of the best cities for new college grads.

Economy

The Tulsa metropolitan area is the economic engine of the Green Country as well as Eastern Oklahoma. In 2017 the Tulsa metropolitan area's GDP was $57.7 billion, up from 43.4 billion in 2009, nearly thirty percent of Oklahoma's economy, and the 53rd largest in the nation. The chief industries of the region are energy, aerospace, telecommunications, and manufacturing. Energy has long been a dominant player in the area's economy, as Tulsa was once dubbed the 'Oil Capital of the World'. Today, Fortune 500 energy companies still call the area home, such as ONEOK and Williams Companies. Also, a majority of American car rental companies are headquartered in the area, such as Fortune 1000 Dollar Thrifty Automotive Group. There are major manufacturing and maintenance operations for the aerospace industry in Tulsa. In 2012, Engine Advocacy ranked the Tulsa Metro as having some of the highest growth in the high-tech industry at 7.6% compared to 2.6% for the national average for 2010–2012, and is expected to have continuous growth throughout 2013. The Tulsa region is home to the 8th best workforce in aerospace, 9th best in Energy and 18th best in telecommunications. In 2001, Tulsa metro's total gross product was in the top one-third of metropolitan areas, states, and countries globally, with more than $29 billion in total goods, expected to grow at a rate of nearly $500 Million every two years.

Among its resident Tulsa area is home to two billionaires, George Kaiser (BOK Financial Corporation), and Lynn Schusterman (philanthropist).

As of Nov 2012, the Metro's unemployment rate is 5.1 percent.

Shopping
Tulsa has many options for shopping. Some of the well known shopping areas are Downtown Tulsa, Brookside (Peoria Avenue), Cherry Street, Brady Arts District, and Utica Square.

Recreation and tourism

Green Country

"Green Country" is a popular term used in different scenarios to describe different aspects of the Greater Tulsa Region, but may also refer specifically to the official Tulsa MSA. Each usage of the term is derived from its official meaning as the tourism designation for all of Northeastern Oklahoma. Its name was devised in the 1960s by the Oklahoma Department of Tourism and Recreation as one of six travel destination regions within the state, but is the most historically significant of all of them, as the name's usage can be traced to the early part of the 20th century. While the Tulsa MSA only officially occupies a section of Green Country as it is defined by the Oklahoma Department of Transportation, the entire region is sometimes referred to as the Greater Tulsa Area. On the same accord, the term "Green Country" often applies to the immediate Tulsa urban area or the city of Tulsa proper, but neither of these are technically the proper use for the term.

Attractions
The area has several lakes and state parks. Major lakes include Keystone, Skiatook, Fort Gibson, and Oologah. Popular state parks include Keystone Lake and Osage Hills.

The area contains two world-renowned museums: Gilcrease and Philbrook, both in Tulsa. Museums focusing on western heritage draw visitors, such as Woolaroc near Bartlesville and Will Rogers Memorial in Claremore.

Lakes and reservoirs
 Birch Lake
 Claremore Lake
 Fort Gibson
 Heyburn Lake
 Hulah Lake
 Kaw Lake
 Keystone Lake
 Oologah Lake
 Skiatook Lake
 Lake Yahola

State parks
 Dripping Springs State Park, Okmulgee County
 Keystone Lake, Tulsa County, Oklahoma
 Osage Hills, Osage County, Oklahoma
 Okmulgee State Park, Okmulgee County
 Sequoyah Bay State Park, Wagoner County
 Wah-Sha-She State Park, Osage County, Oklahoma
 Walnut Creek State Park, Osage County, Oklahoma

Other natural attractions
 Mohawk Park, a city-owned park in northeastern Tulsa that includes the Tulsa Zoo and the Oxley Nature Center
 Tallgrass Prairie Preserve is in Osage County, Oklahoma, near Foraker, Oklahoma.
 Turkey Mountain (Oklahoma), an urban wilderness park in southwestern Tulsa
 Redbud Valley, a city-owned nature reserve and wilderness trail

References

External links

 
Metropolitan areas of Oklahoma